George-Étienne Cartier was a federal electoral district in Quebec, Canada, that was represented in the House of Commons of Canada from 1917 to 1925.

This riding was created in 1914 from parts of Maisonneuve and St. Lawrence ridings. It consisted of the St. Louis and St. Jean Baptiste wards of the city of Montreal.

The electoral district was abolished in 1924 when it was redistributed into Cartier, St. James and St. Lawrence—St. George ridings.

It was named in honour of the Quebec politician George-Étienne Cartier.

Members of Parliament

This riding elected the following Members of Parliament:

Election results

See also 

 List of Canadian federal electoral districts
 Past Canadian electoral districts

External links
Riding history from the Library of Parliament

Former federal electoral districts of Quebec
George-Étienne Cartier